Gigaset AG, formerly known as Siemens Home and Office Communication Devices, is a German multinational corporation based in Bocholt, Germany.  The company is most active in the area of communications technology. Gigaset manufactures DECT telephones. In 2017, it had 930 employees, revenue of 293 million Euro and sales activities in approximately 70 countries.

Gigaset is owned by the Goldin Group (>70%) and hence controlled by Hong Kong businessman and entrepreneur Pan Sutong. Gigaset AG is listed on the Prime Standard of Deutsche Börse and its shares are traded on the Frankfurt Stock Exchange (ISIN: DE0005156004).

History
Gigaset Communications was established on 1 October 2008, when , a private equity firm, acquired 80.2% equity interest in Siemens Home and Office Communication Devices GmbH & Co. KG (SHC) from Siemens AG for 45 million euros.

Products and services

Gigaset creates numerous products for home and small office use:

Cordless phones: Specializing in DECT and Cat-iq  technology, Gigaset is the European market leader and offers a wide variety of wireless phones (900MHz, 2.4GHz and DECT).
Smartphones: Gigaset GS160, Gigaset GS270, GS290, GX290,GS3,GS4, GS5  
Feature Phone Gigaset GL7 Flip phone with apps and internet access, WhatsApp, Facebook, Youtube, Google Assistance with speech, Google Maps, GPS, Radio FM: Headphone jack	3.5 mm, SOS function for triggering an emergency call (Call to up to 5 predefined telephone numbers), WhatsApp key, Dual nanoSIM + separate memory card slot Micro-SDHC memory card up to 128 GB, 2 MP Camera, WiFi 2,4 GHz, Bluetooth 4.2, USB-C, GSM / 2G:	850 / 900 / 1800 / 1900 MHz , UMTS / 3G	: 900 / 2100 MHz, LTE / FDD / 4G:	800 / 1800 / 2100 / 2600 MHz,  KaiOS 2.5.3.2    

VoIP phones: A variety of cordless (DECT) VoIP products are available. Certain products offer free calls using gigaset.net SIP network.
Corded phones: The company sells their analog phones by the brand "euroset".
Business telephony: VoIP based corded and cordless DECT/Cat-iq phones, repeaters and IP PBX solutions for small and medium-sized enterprises, sold under the "Gigaset pro" brand. 
Smart home / security: sold under "Gigaset elements" brand. The typical system consists of a base station, motion, smoke detector, door and window sensors as well as a siren and camera. The system also offers a plug and a button that can be used to control electrical devices in the house. The devices are connected to the base-station through DECT Ultra Low Energy (DECT-ULE) and the base (a home gateway) is connected to the internet by wired LAN. The user has the ability to get notifications on his smartphone by using a dedicated app (available for Android and iOS).

Recent Gigaset and Gigaset pro cordless phones support Cat-iq 2.0 with HD Voice, allowing high-quality calls with a frequency response up to 7 kHz on VoIP/SIP phones and home gateways, using the G.722 wideband audio codec (dubbed High Definition Sound Performance (HDSP) by Gigaset).

Eco Dect and Eco Dect Plus are power-saving technologies used by Gigaset. Energy savings of 60-80% are available using a combination of low-energy switched-mode power supply unit, reduction of transmission power by adjusting transmission power according to the handset's distance to the base station, and switching off radio wave transmission completely when the handset is docked and charging or in standby mode. A green home logo indicates that the product has these features.

References

External links

Technology companies established in 2008
Electronics companies of Germany
Mobile phone manufacturers
German companies established in 2008
German brands
Siemens